8/5 may refer to:
August 5 (month-day date notation)
May 8 (day-month date notation)
Hours of work covered at Working time#Workweek structure